Kendriya Vidyalaya(CRPF), Bantalab  is a school in Jammu and part of the Kendriya Vidyalayas in India. It was started in 1976. The school is affiliated to the Central Board of Secondary Education. The school has classes from I to XII. Kendriya Vidyalaya was shifted to its newly constructed building on September 09,2002  which is situated near the campus of CRPF, on the Jammu-Ambh-Gharota-Road. The Hon'ble Commissioner (KVS, New Delhi) Sh. H. M. Caire inaugurated it.

See also 

 Central Board of Secondary Education
 Kendriya Vidyalaya
 List of Kendriya Vidyalayas
 NCERT

References

Kendriya Vidyalayas
1970 establishments in Jammu and Kashmir
Educational institutions established in 1970